Wisconsin's 10th congressional district is a former congressional district of the United States House of Representatives in Wisconsin. It was created following the 1890 Census, and was abolished after the 1970 Census.

Throughout its existence it was located in the northwest or north of Wisconsin. Between the 1900 Census and the 1930 Census, when Wisconsin had its greatest ever representation of eleven districts, the 10th District covered initially the rural area bordering Michigan, but after redistricting in 1910 it was shifted to the west of the state bordering Minnesota. After 1930, the old 11th District covering the northwest bordering Lake Superior was absorbed into the 10th District for the remainder of its existence.

With the sole exception of Bernard J. Gehrmann, who represented the district as a Progressive from 1935 to 1943, all Representatives ever elected to the seat were members of the Republican Party.

List of members representing the district

References

 Congressional Biographical Directory of the United States 1774–present

Former congressional districts of the United States
10
1893 establishments in Wisconsin
1973 disestablishments in Wisconsin